Vinea is a carbonated grape-based soft drink invented in Czechoslovakia in 1973 
by Slovak Ján Farkaš, a biochemist working for the Research Institute for Viticulture and Wine-making in Bratislava. Production of the drink began in 1974. After years of trademark ownership disputes, Vinea was sold to Kofola in January 2008.

References

Grape sodas
Products introduced in 1973
Slovak drinks